"Your Love's on the Line" is a song recorded by American country music artist Earl Thomas Conley.  The song was written by Conley along with Randy Scruggs, and was released in April 1983 as the lead single from the album Don't Make It Easy for Me.  The song was Conley's third number one on the country chart.  The single went to number one for one week and spent a total of thirteen weeks on the country chart.

Charts

Weekly charts

Year-end charts

References

1983 singles
Earl Thomas Conley songs
Songs written by Randy Scruggs
Songs written by Earl Thomas Conley
RCA Records singles
1983 songs